Heteroderces paeta is a moth in the family Lecithoceridae. It was described by Edward Meyrick in 1929. It is found in Sri Lanka.

The wingspan is about 8 mm. The forewings are white, faintly irrorated (sprinkled) with greyish, with some minute scattered black specks. The costal edge is black at the base and the discal stigmata are black, the first small, the second rather large and round, a rather large black dot below and rather obliquely before it. The hindwings are grey.

References

Moths described in 1929
Lecithoceridae